The 2001 WNBA season was the 2nd season for the Miami Sol. The team earned its first and only playoff berth, losing in the opening round to the New York Liberty in three games.

Offseason

WNBA Draft

Regular season

Season standings

Season schedule

Playoffs

Player stats

References

Miami Sol seasons
Miami
Miami Sol